Duane DeSoto (born 1978 in Spokane, Washington) is an American professional longboard surfrider

DeSoto won the 2010 Oxbow ASP World Longboard Championship, defeating France's Antoine Delpero in the Final at Makaha. In 1997, he finished third in the ASP World Tour. He received the Professional Surfer Award at the 8th Annual John Kelly Environmental Awards in 2010.

DeSoto played Duke Kahanamoku in the 2022 documentary Waterman – Duke: Ambassador of Aloha.

References

1978 births
Living people
American surfers
Sportspeople from Hawaii
People from Honolulu County, Hawaii